Shannon Eckstein (born 1983) is an Australian Ironman surf lifesaving champion with his brother Caine Eckstein.

Shannon is regarded as the greatest surf lifesaving ironman in history winning 8 Australian ironman titles, 6 world ironman titles and 9 Nutri-Grain series titles (with over 40 individual race wins).

References

External links
 

1983 births
Living people
Australian male triathletes
Australian surf lifesavers
Sportspeople from the Gold Coast, Queensland
World Games gold medalists
World Games bronze medalists
Competitors at the 2009 World Games
Australian lifesaving athletes